Events in the year 1992 in the Republic of India.

Incumbents
 President of India – R. Venkataraman until 25 July, Shankar Dayal Sharma
 Prime Minister of India – P. V. Narasimha Rao
 Chief Justice of India – Madhukar Hiralal Kania until 17 November, Lalit Mohan Sharma

Governors
 Andhra Pradesh – Krishan Kant 
 Arunachal Pradesh – Surendranath Dwivedy
 Assam – Loknath Mishra 
 Bihar – Mohammad Shafi Qureshi
 Goa – Bhanu Prakash Singh 
 Gujarat – Sarup Singh
 Haryana – Dhanik Lal Mandal 
 Himachal Pradesh – Virendra Verma 
 Jammu and Kashmir – Girish Chandra Saxena
 Karnataka – Bhanu Pratap Singh (until 6 January), Khurshed Alam Khan (starting 6 January)
 Kerala – B. Rachaiah
 Madhya Pradesh – M. A. Khan
 Maharashtra – C. Subramaniam
 Manipur – Chintamani Panigrahi 
 Meghalaya – Madhukar Dighe
 Mizoram – Swaraj Kaushal 
 Nagaland – M. M. Thomas (until 12 April), Loknath Mishra (starting 13 April)
 Odisha – Yagya Dutt Sharma 
 Punjab – Surendra Nath 
 Rajasthan – Sarup Singh (until 5 February), Marri Chenna Reddy (starting 5 February)
 Sikkim – Radhakrishna Hariram Tahiliani 
 Tamil Nadu – Bhishma Narain Singh 
 Tripura – K. V. Raghunatha Reddy 
 Uttar Pradesh – B. Satya Narayan Reddy 
 West Bengal – Saiyid Nurul Hasan

Events
 National income - 7,611,959 million
 1 February – Chief Judicial Magistrate of Bhopal Court declares Warren Anderson, ex-CEO of Union Carbide, a fugitive under Indian law for failing to appear in the Bhopal disaster case, and orders the Indian government to press for an extradition from the United States.
 23 April – Scam of Harshad Mehta was exposed by journalist Sucheta Dalal, which consisted of SBI 500 Crore Scam and illegal usage of loophole in banking system.
 May – Over 200 people die in Cuttack in Odisha, after drinking illegally brewed liquor. About 600 people were hospitalised (see: 1992 Odisha liquor deaths). 
 14 August – Veerappan Gang Trapped and killed Mysore District SP, T.Harikrishna, SI Shakeel Ahmed and four constables named Benegonda, C.M.Kalappa, Sundara and M.P.Appachu, through a false informant near Meenyam in Karnataka
 20 August – Meitei language (officially known as Manipuri language) was included in the constitutional scheduled languages' list and made one of the official languages of the Indian Republic.
 2 October – Zee Television, a Hindi language satellite and cable television station, a first officially regular broadcasting service to start in Mumbai.
 6 December – Members of the Vishva Hindu Parishad (VHP, World Hindu Council) tear down a 16th-century mosque located in Ayodhya, in Northern India. The mosque is built over a shrine which exhorted the small piece of land as Ram Janmabhoomi – the birthplace of Lord Rama. This sparks off nationwide communal riots in which some 3,000 people die.
 Indian Rupee exchange rate collapsed. It was 20 Rs to 1 dollar in January 1992 and it became 30 Rs to 1 dollar in December 1992. A huge 50% depreciation in value.

Law
 Government of India establishes SEBI, stock exchange regulator.

Births
3 January  Nikki Galrani, actress.
5 January – Sanjay Balmuchu, footballer.
27 February – Abigail Jain, actress.
1 March – Alwyn George, footballer.
18 April – K. L. Rahul, cricketer.
4 March – Gaurav Sharma, author.
4 May  Shiv Kumar Sharma, Assistant Professor.
9 May  Sai Pallavi, actress.
31 May  Sobhita Dhulipala, actress, model and Miss Earth India.
4 July – Yuki Bhambri, tennis player.
30 July – Vishal Kumar, football player.
1 August  Mrunal  Thakur, actress.
15 September – Shilton D'Silva, soccer player.
17 October  
Keerthy Suresh, actress.
Pranitha Subhash, actress.
21 October  Srinidhi Shetty, actress and model.
23 November - Navdeep Saini, cricketer
24 December – Soram Anganba, footballer.
31 December – Manu Attri, badminton player.
7 August – Deepak Chahar, cricketer.
15 August – Baskaran Adhiban, chess Grandmaster.

Deaths
27 January – Bharat Bhushan, actor (born 1920).
23 April – Satyajit Ray, filmmaker (born 1921).
17 July – Kanan Devi, actress and singer (born 1916).
27 July – Amjad Khan, actor and director (born 1940).
3 November – Prem Nath, actor (born 1926).

Full date unknown
V. K. Gokak, writer and scholar (born 1909).

See also 
 Bollywood films of 1992

References

 
India
Years of the 20th century in India